Like many other medical conditions, obesity is the result of an interplay between environmental and genetic factors.  Studies have identified variants in several genes that may contribute to weight gain and body fat distribution; although, only in a few cases are genes the primary cause of obesity.

Polymorphisms in various genes controlling appetite and metabolism predispose to obesity under certain dietary conditions.  The percentage of obesity that can be attributed to genetics varies widely, depending on the population examined, from 6% to 85%, with the typical estimate at 50%. It is likely that in each person a number of genes contribute to the likelihood of developing obesity in small part, with each gene increasing or decreasing the odds marginally, and together determining how an individual responds to the environmental factors.  As of 2006, more than 41 sites on the human genome have been linked to the development of obesity when a favorable environment is present. Some of these obesogenic (weight gain) or leptogenic (weight loss) genes may influence the obese individual's response to weight loss or weight management.

Genes

Although genetic deficiencies are currently considered rare, variations in these genes may predispose to common obesity. Many candidate genes are highly expressed in the central nervous system.

Several additional loci have been identified. Also, several quantitative trait loci for BMI have been identified.

Confirmed and hypothesized associations include:

Some studies have focused upon inheritance patterns without focusing upon specific genes. One study found that 80% of the offspring of two obese parents were obese, in contrast to less than 10% of the offspring of two parents who were of normal weight.

The thrifty gene hypothesis postulates that due to dietary scarcity during human evolution people are prone to obesity. Their ability to take advantage of rare periods of abundance by storing energy as fat would be advantageous during times of varying food availability, and individuals with greater adipose reserves would more likely survive famine. This tendency to store fat, however, would be maladaptive in societies with stable food supplies. This is the presumed reason that Pima Native Americans, who evolved in a desert ecosystem, developed some of the highest rates of obesity when exposed to a Western lifestyle.

Numerous studies of laboratory rodents provide strong evidence that genetics play an important role in obesity.

The risk of obesity is determined by not only specific genotypes but also gene-gene interactions. However, there are still challenges associated with detecting gene-gene interactions for obesity.

Genes protective against obesity 
There are also genes that can be protective against obesity. For instance, in GPR75 variants were identified as such alleles in ~640,000 sequenced exomes which may be relevant to e.g. therapeutic strategies against obesity. Other candidate anti-obesity-related genes include ALK, TBC1D1, and SRA1.

Genetic syndromes
The term "non-syndromic obesity" is sometimes used to exclude these conditions. In people with early-onset severe obesity (defined by an onset before 10 years of age and body mass index over three standard deviations above normal), 7% harbor a single locus mutation.

See also 
 New World Syndrome
 Nutritional genomics

Related:
 Human genetic variation

References

Obesity
Behavioural genetics